Alfonso Ratliff (born February 18, 1956) is an American former professional boxer who competed from 1980 to 1989, holding the WBC and The Ring cruiserweight titles in 1985. He was later coaching at the Harvey Boxing Club in Harvey IL.

Amateur boxing career
As an amateur, Ratliff won the Chicago Golden Gloves title in 1980, and won a decision against Mitch Green in intercity competition.

Professional boxing career

Ratliff turned professional in 1980 and won the WBC and lineal cruiserweight titles with a decision win over Carlos De León in 1985. He lost the belt in his first defense to Bernard Benton via decision the same year. In September 1986, Ratliff was stopped in the second round by Mike Tyson, who went on to become the youngest ever world heavyweight champion in his next fight. Ratliff retired in 1989 after a TKO loss to Lee Roy Murphy.

Professional boxing record

See also
List of world cruiserweight boxing champions

References

External links

Alfonso Ratliff - CBZ Profile

1956 births
Living people
American male boxers
African-American boxers
Boxers from Mississippi
Sportspeople from Clarksdale, Mississippi
Boxers from Chicago
Heavyweight boxers
World cruiserweight boxing champions
World Boxing Council champions
The Ring (magazine) champions